The 1998–99 Washington Huskies men's basketball team represented the University of Washington for the 1998–99 NCAA Division I men's basketball season. Led by sixth-year head coach Bob Bender, the Huskies were members of the Pacific-10 Conference and played their home games on campus at Hec Edmundson Pavilion in Seattle, Washington.

There was no conference tournament this season; last played in 1990, it resumed in 2002.

Washington made the NCAA tournament for the second straight year. Seeded seventh in the Midwest regional, they met tenth seed Miami (OH) in the Louisiana Superdome in New Orleans and lost by a point. Wally Szczerbiak led the scoring for Miami with 43 points; his teammates scored only sixteen. Washington's next NCAA appearance was five years later in 2004.

Built over seventy years earlier in 1927, Hec Edmundson Pavilion underwent a renovation following this season and reopened in November  The Huskies' home court for the 1999–2000 season was KeyArena at Seattle Center, the home of the NBA's Seattle SuperSonics.

Postseason results

|-
!colspan=6 style=| NCAA tournament

References

External links
Sports Reference – Washington Huskies: 1998–99 basketball season

Washington Huskies men's basketball seasons
Washington Huskies
Washington Huskies
Washington
Washington